Margarita Balanas (born 30 September 1993) is a Latvian concert cellist and conductor.

Career
Balanas won her first international competition at age eight, and made her concert debut in London at Wigmore Hall at age 17.

She has performed at the Royal Festival Hall in London, and at Corum as part of the Festival de Radio France et Montpellier with her sister Kristine Balanas.

Balanas has appeared as a soloist with Iași "Moldova" Philharmonic Orchestra, conducted by Gabriel Bebeselea.

Appearing with Carlos Izcaray conducting the Orquestra Sinfonica do Porto Casa da Música, she performed Tchaikovsky’s Variations on a Rococo Theme in 2015.

She performed with Lynn Harrell at the Adelaide International Cello Festival in 2014. Her playing was favorably noted.

In 2018 she performed with the Orchestra of St John's, conducted by John Lubbock at Ashmolean Museum Proms.

In 2019, she and her sister performed at The Alpine Fellowship annual symposium.

Balanas was selected by Gautier Capuçon for the "Classe d’Excellence de Violoncelle" at the Fondation Louis Vuitton with performances broadcast on Medici.tv.

Instruments
Balanas plays a Charles-Adolphe Gand ‘Auguste Tolbecque 1849 cello. Her former instruments include Nicolo Gagliano and Giovanni Battista Rogeri cellos.

Personal life
Balanas is the sister of violinists Kristine Balanas and Roberts Balanas.

References

External links
Margarita Balanas performs Max Bruch at Foundation Louis Vuitton
The Balanas play Handel-Halverson

Living people
1993 births